Patrick Versluys (born 5 September 1958) is a Belgian former professional racing cyclist. He rode in two editions of the Tour de France.

Major results

1980
 4th Circuit des Frontières
1981
 1st Kampioenschap van Vlaanderen
 3rd Grand Prix de Wallonie
 3rd Le Samyn
 3rd Omloop van het Leiedal
 5th GP Stad Zottegem
 10th GP de Fourmies
 4th Grote Prijs Jef Scherens
1982
 1st Leeuwse Pijl
 7th Tour of Flanders
 8th Milan–San Remo
1983
 1st Omloop van het Leiedal
 3rd Grand Prix Impanis-Van Petegem
 6th Brabantse Pijl
 7th Paris–Roubaix
 8th Overall Driedaagse van De Panne-Koksijde
 10th Circuit des Frontières
1984
 2nd Nokere Koerse
 3rd Amstel Gold Race
 6th Brussels–Ingooigem
 6th Brabantse Pijl
 8th Paris–Roubaix
 8th Overall Tour de Luxembourg
1985
 1st Grand Prix de Denain
 2nd Nokere Koerse
 4th Amstel Gold Race
 8th E3 Harelbeke
1986
 1st De Kustpijl
 3rd Grand Prix de Wallonie
 4th E3 Harelbeke
 5th Le Samyn
 6th Binche–Tournai–Binche
 9th Paris–Roubaix
1987
 2nd Paris–Roubaix
1988
 1st Nokere Koerse

References

External links
 

1958 births
Living people
Belgian male cyclists
People from Eeklo
Cyclists from East Flanders